The Hays Canyon Range is a mountain range in northwest Washoe County, Nevada, adjacent the California border. The Surprise Valley with its alkali lakes and the Warner Mountains lie to the west.

Description
The Hays Canyon Range is a mostly linear, north-south trending range, variable in width, about 40 mi long. The range overlooks the linear Surprise Valley to the west; high elevation dry lakes, above 5500 ft lie to the northeast. Crooks Lake lies in the north of the lower elevation section of the range.

The highpoint of the range is Hays Canyon Peak,  at the extreme south of the range. Other peaks from north to south are:

Fortynine Mountain, 
Big Hat Mountain, 
Drag Road Canyon–Button Brush Flat
The Craters
Little Hat Mountain, 
Divine Peak,  (in east)
Hays Canyon Peak,  (west of center)
Pegleg Canyon
Red Mountain,

References

External links
Hays Canyon Peak, Nevada, peakbagger.com

Mountain ranges of Nevada
Mountain ranges of Washoe County, Nevada